Piltown GAA is a Gaelic Athletic Association club located in Piltown, County Kilkenny, Ireland. A Piltown GAA club was founded in 1887.  Several versions existed until the modern club founded in 1953 following the advent of Parish Rule in Kilkenny.  Piltown fields teams in Hurling, Gaelic Football, Camogie and Ladies' Gaelic Football at all ages from Under-8 to adult in each code.

History

Piltown GAA was formed in 1887, and went through many amalgamations until Parish Rule was introduced in the 1950s.  The modern club was formed in 1953.  The original grounds consisting of about 5 acres were purchased from the Land Commission on 1 November 1945  The original trustees were Canon Philip Comerford PP, Patrick Power MCC (Piltown) and Richard Keating (Clonmore). The price paid was £77. In 1957, Eddie Norris and Pa O'Shea replaced Canon Comerford and Patrick Power as trustees and Bob Aylward, the County Board Chairman was added to the trustees.

Early meetings took place at St. Columba's Hall which was located at the old graveyard in Piltown.  After it was demolished, meetings took place at Anthony's Inn, Piltown National School and eventually in the dressing room that used to exist at the road end.

In 1961, the club started raising funds through the annual fete (carnivals), commencing on Easter Sunday.  They featured live music in a marquee, amusements and tournament hurling matches with top class clubs from all over the south east.

Work started on developing the grounds in the early sixties.  In 1961, the wall at the road end was erected along with the original dressing rooms, complete with showers and toilets.  In 1962/63, the pitch was levelled  resodded and drained.  In 1964, a 10-foot wire and post fence was erected around the main pitch.  In 1965, the toolshed and the original scoreboard was erected at the road end and it took about £9000 to transform the pitch. The main playing pitch was officially opened on 12 August 1965 when the Kilkenny Senior Hurling team played a challenge match against Waterford.  The game was refereed by Tommy Foran and the Kilkenny team featured Piltown's Ned Power (Brenor).

In 1972, an additional 12 acres of adjacent lands were purchased.  These were lands formerly owned by Issac and Lilly Tector from Piltown.  The representatives of the club paid £3,500 for it, (£500 more than their brief), proceeds of the carnivals.

In 1977, it was decided provide a complex building with an estimated cost of £40,000. With the popularity of carnivals beginning to wane, a new source of income had to be found. In 1982, the club ran a 600 club draw which a year later turned into what is now known as the Hurlers Co-op draw. (In 1991, the Kilkenny County Board became involved)

Since the 1980s, Piltown GAA has played an integral part in the community with the provision of two full size playing pitches and a juvenile pitch, a handball court, two squash courts and a gym, with Bar & Social facilities in the GAA Complex that was constructed in 1985. The GAA Complex was officially opened by the former President of the GAA, Paddy Buggy on 15 August 1986.

A third pitch soon followed in the 1990s and became an all-weather pitch before having match standard floodlights added. The floodlighting on the all-weather pitch was switched on for the first time on Friday 18 November 2005. The first championship game played underlights in Kilkenny took place in Piltown. It was a Senior Football championship clash between Piltown and Railyard in February 2006 with the result being a win for the visitors.  A warm-up area was then created at the lower end of the all-weather pitch.  In 2010, a shed from the old sugar factory in Carlow was re-erected as a stand and 2013, some benches were added around the pitch.

In 2012, work started on a precast hurling wall and the redevelopment of the pitch-and-putt course into a fourth playing field.  The hurling wall precast structure was erected on 30 March. Lighting was added in 2013. Also in 2013, work started on removing the old wire fence and replacing it with a more modern aesthetically improved lower fence.

There have been many successes on the field, with the highlight year being 2003 when the club won the county Junior hurling title and the Leinster Junior hurling title. (There was no All-Ireland series in 2003) The year was capped by becoming the AIB Kilkenny Club of the Year.  The original club played in two Senior County Finals in 1904 and 1910, unfortunately losing out on both occasions to Tullaroan.

At juvenile level the biggest achievement was winning Division 3 of Féile Na nGael in 1979 when hosted in Kilkenny and being runners-up in Division 1 to Wolfe Tones (Clare) when hosted in Clare in 1986. Piltown also won the National Community games title in 1989 beating Portumna of Galway. They have been hurling county titles won all the way up from Schools to Junior.
 
Although hurling is the predominant interest of most Piltown GAA fans, the Piltown area has a very strong Gaelic Football tradition and have won two Intermediate county titles and one junior county title as well as many underage and schools titles.

There have been several iterations of Camogie clubs but the current one is the most vibrant and successful. Piltown Camogie won a junior title in 2008 and an Intermediate league title in 2013.  Numerous Camogie titles have been won at all age groups at county level.  They have also won a Leinster Community Games title in 2009 when beating Lucan Sarsfields and subsequently taking the bronze medal nationally.

In 2010, and based on the foundation of several primary schools county titles, a Ladies Gaelic Football club was set up.  It primarily catered for juveniles but in 2013, Gaelic4Mothers & Others was introduced. The Under-14 team reached the Roinn B County final in 2013. Also in 2014, the parish fielded two teams in the Roinn A primary schools championship. One from Piltown NS and the other from a combination of Owning NS and Templeorum NS.

Hurling Honours
 Leinster Junior Club Hurling Championships: 1
 2004
 Kilkenny Junior Hurling Championships: 3
 1981, 1996, 2003
 Finalists - 1995, 2000, 2011, 2018
 Kilkenny Intermediate Hurling Championship:
 Finalists - 1985, 1986, 1988
 Kilkenny Senior Hurling Championship:
 Finalists - 1904, 1910
Féile na nGael Division 1:
 Finalists - 1986

U16 Quad-Champions 1985: 
Hurling League & Championship double; Football League & Championship double.

Camogie

Camogie has been played in Piltown for many years. The earliest reports of a team in the parish was Owning Camogie Club.  This team existed around the late 1950s, early 1960s. They trained in a field in Fanningstown opposite where Bertie Duggan lives.  Among their players were Tessie Duggan (Flynn), Eileen Kiely (Norris), Breda Power, Maud Murphy (Kelly) and Kathleen Duggan (Holden).  There were also players from Windgap such as Wazzie Power and Eileen Doyle. There are no reports of any successes but there are stories of vans being stolen to get to matches in Mullinavat! Granddaughters of Eileen Kiely and Wazzie Power play for the club today.

In the late 1970s, Piltown had a minimal club fielding at only Under-14.  This team did compete in the Under-14 Feile Na nGael competition when it was held in Kilkenny in 1978 and 1979.  Sean O'Shea was the chairman at the time.

1978 Panel: Josie O’Shea, Michelle Gilman, Lucy Giles, Marie Fitzpatrick, Mary Kinsella, Fiona Knox, Carmel Phelan, Margaret Holden, Evonne Fitzpatrick, Marie Cuddihy, Celia Giles, Ann Dunne, Ann O’Brien, Margaret Carroll, Lucy Knox, Margaret Talbot.

1979 Panel: Marie Fitzpatrick, Michelle Gilman, Lucy Knox, Bernadette Gilman, Majella Giles, Stephanie Carroll, Ann Dunne, Kay Cuddihy, Evonne Fitzpatrick, Denise Everett, Celia Giles, Fiona Coffey, Marie Power, Rosemary O’Toole, Pauline Foyle.

In the 1980s, Piltown Camogie Club emerged with the driving force being Maura Brennan (Owning).  The team included several girls who have children playing today such as Sheila Keegan (Norris), Kay McCarthy (Phelan) and Teresa Brophy (Phelan).  Like the Owning club before there were also players from the Windgap parish like Joan O'Gorman, Judith Phelan and Mary Norris (Walsh).  The Junior team contested the Junior "B" County Final in 1988. A strong Tullogher team beat them 6-6 to 0-3 on a wet day in Nowlan Park. The manager was Willie McCormack. Others to manage the team in that period were Dan Phelan, Jim Grant and Seamus Norris.  The club colours were white and red. This club did win an Under-14 Roinn C title around 1987 or 1988 and featured players like Cathy and Mairead Brennan.  Michelle O'Shea was another prominent underage player during this period. The club continued into the 1990s when titles at Under-14 Roinn "C" (1994) and Under-16 Roinn"C" (1996) were captured, both teams were captained by current coach Miram Reid.

During the 1980s and 1990s, Piltown's most successful Camogie player to date, Marie Fitzpatrick (Oldcourt) played Camogie with St Brigid’s, Ballycallan. Marie had won the Feile Skills in 1980 and is one of only two Kilkenny girls to have won the National title. She went on to play in goal for the Kilkenny most successful ever senior team, winning seven senior All-Ireland medals and six National League medals.

In 2000, Eileen Malone and Marie O'Sullivan founded the current version of Piltown Camogie Club.  Former Chairperson from the previous incarnation of the club, Maura Brennan, along with Jim Malone, Catherine McCarthy, Bernie Duggan and Frances Malone quickly came on board to form a strong committee. They were soon joined by Kate Foley who proved to be a top class administrator  They formed the backbone for the marvellous successes that have followed. Starting with a group of 20 primary school girls  the club claimed County titles at Primary Schools and Under-14 in 2002.  The club has since built up a membership of over 100 players, competing at all grades. It has now claimed several county titles in every grade right up to Junior. The club claimed its first adult title in 2008 by winning the junior county final, beating Dicksboro in a replay in Piltown.  The panel featured players from previous versions of the club such as Mairead Diffley (Brennan) and Michelle O'Shea.  It also had Piltown's most successful current player, Katie Power who won an All-Star in 2009 and a second in 2013. In 2009, the club won the bronze medal at the National Community Games finals in Athlone. In 2010, Roinn A titles were won at Primary Schools level and Under-14. Many of the club's players have represented the county with distinction as the club goes from strength to strength.

In 2013, the club won its first Intermediate County Title when they beat Ballyhale Shamrocks 0-13 to 0-10 in John Locke Park, Callan. However the Shamrocks gained revenge in the Champions Final in Mullinavat when they beat Piltown 1-9 to 0-11 after extra time. Twelve months later on 11 October 2014, Piltown returned to the Intermediate Championship County Final having already secured the All-County League and League titles  in 2014 after wins over St. Annes.  The venue was John Locke Park, Callan and the opponents, St, Brigids of Kilmanagh.  Piltown won the final comprehensively by 4-18 to 0-5 to become a senior club for the first time ever and compile an unprecedented treble while remaining unbeaten in Kilkenny in competitive games in 2014. Kelly Ann Doyle was awarded the inaugural Shem Downey Player of the Match award. They then went on to win the Leinster title when they beat Camross of Laois in the final held in Clane by 3-10 to 4-5 with Karen Duggan picking up the player of the match award. They then rounded this run off by achieving the ultimate prize of winning the 2015 All-Ireland title by beating the reigning champions, Lismore of Waterford 1-10 to 1-9 at Croke Park with Chloe Blackmore scoring the Piltown goal and Kelly Ann Doyle winning the player of the match award.

Camogie Roll of Honour 
Kilkenny Senior League

2019 Piltown beat Thomastown 3-15 to 0-10 in Mullinavat

All-Ireland Intermediate Championship
 
2015 Piltown beat Lismore (Waterford) 1-10 to 1-9 in Croke Park, Dublin

Leinster Intermediate Championship
 
2014 Piltown beat Camross (Laois) 3-10 to 4-5 in Clane, Co. Kildare

Kilkenny Intermediate Championship
 
2014 Piltown beat St. Brigids 4-18 to 0-5 in John Locke Park, Callan

Kilkenny Intermediate League
 
2014 Piltown beat St Anne’s 1-10 to 1-9 in Danesfort

2013 Piltown beat Ballyhale Shamrocks 0-13 to 0-10 in John Locke Park, Callan

Kilkenny Intermediate All County League
 
2014 Piltown beat St Anne’s 1-9 to 1-7 in Danesfort

Kilkenny Junior Championship
 
2008 Piltown beat Dicksboro 1-8 to 1-5 (Replay) in Piltown (Drawn Game in Bennetsbridge 1-8 each)

Kilkenny Junior B All County League
 
2015 Piltown beat Carrickshock 1-10 to 3-3 in Piltown

Kilkenny Under-21 Championship

2019 "A" Piltown beat Thomastown 2-11 to 2-5 in Kilmacow

2016 "A" Piltown beat Thomastown 2-9 to 0-11 in Ballyhale
 
2012 "B" Piltown beat Rower Inistioge 2-6 to 1-7 in Ballyhale

Kilkenny Minor Championship
 
2006 "B" Piltown beat Dicksboro 4-7 to 0-2 in Callan (Played 18/02/2007)

2011 "C" Piltown beat St. Anne's 2-8 to 1-6 in Clara

2012 "B" Piltown beat St. Martin's 2-7 to 1-3 in Palmerstown

2021 "B" Piltown beat St. Martin's 3-10 to 1-9 in Thomastown
 
Kilkenny Under-16 Championship
 
1996 "C" Piltown beat Tullogher 2-6 to 0-3 in Mullinavat

2005 "B" Piltown beat Paulstown 4-10 to 3-6 in Kilmanagh

2011 "B" Piltown beat Danesfort 6-12 to 0-4 in Hugginstown

2012 "A" Piltown beat Dicksboro 1-12 to 2-7 in Ballyhale

Kilkenny Minor League
 
2015 "A" Piltown beat Dicksboro 3-12 to 2-7 in Ballyhale

2018 "A" Piltown beat Thomastown 2-11 to 3-7 in Piltown

Kilkenny Under-16 League
 
2013 "A" Piltown beat Glenmore 5-10 to 2-8 in Piltown

Kilkenny Under-16 "Pink Day" Blitz
 
2010 Piltown (James Stephens, Windgap, St. Lachtain's) in Piltown
 
Kilkenny Under-14 Championship
 
1987 "C" Piltown
 
1994 "C" Piltown beat St. Anne's in Callan

2002 "C" Piltown beat Carrickshock 2-6 to 1-0 in Windgap

2009 "B" Piltown beat Muckalee 6-4 to 1-0 in Callan

2010 "A" Piltown beat Windgap 4-11 to 0-6 in Mullinavat

Kilkenny Under-14 Shield
 
2013 "A" Piltown beat St. Brigid's 4-3 to 1-5 in Piltown

Kilkenny Under-14 Féile Na nGael Championship
 
2012 Piltown beat Dicksboro 2-0 to 1-2 in Windgap

National Under-14 Community Games

2009 Piltown beat Sheelin (Cavan) - "Bronze" 7-6 to 0-0 at Athlone I.T.
 
Leinster Under-14 Community Games
 
2009 Piltown beat Lucan Sarsfields - "Gold" 1-6 to 2-2 at Carlow Town

2010 Piltown lost to Lucan Sarsfields - "Silver" at Carlow Town
 
Kilkenny Under-14 Community Games
 
2009 Piltown beat Kilmanagh 6-1 to 2-0 in Piltown

2010 Piltown beat Urlingford 9-6 to 0-1 in Piltown
 
Kilkenny Primary Schools Under-13 Championship
 
2002 "D" Piltown beat St. John's 10-6 to 3-1 in Palmerstown

2003 "C" Piltown beat Muckalee 3-4 to 3-1

2004 "B" Piltown beat Paulstown 7-2 to 2-1 in Nowlan Park

2010 "A" Piltown beat Thomastown 4-7 to 3-4 in Nowlan Park
 
Kilkenny Under-12 League
 
2002 Piltown beat Thomastown

2008 Piltown beat Mooncoin 4-8 to 2-1 in Mullinavat

2011 "B" Piltown beat Ballyhale Shamrocks 3-5 to 0-0 in Piltown

2012 "B" Piltown beat St. Brigids 5-7 to 1-3 in Piltown

2013 "B" Piltown beat Glenmore 4-3 to 0-2 in Piltown

2015 "A" Piltown beat Thomastown 1-3 to 1-1 in Kilmacow

Kilkenny Under-12 Mini League
 
2001 Piltown beat Thomastown 8-3 to 2-1 on aggregate in Thomastown
 
Under-10 County League - East Final
 
2010 Piltown beat St. Brigid’s (Kilmanagh) 3-0 to 0-0 in Windgap

2011 Piltown  
 
Under-10 South League
 
2007 Piltown beat Mullinavat

Under-8 Piltown Blitz 
 
2011 Piltown (Windgap, Carrickshock, John Lockes)
 
Under-8 Thomastown Blitz

2011 Piltown beat Clara
 
Ann Dwan Memorial Tournament
 
2009 Piltown beat Thomastown (Under-12) 2-2 to 0-1 in Piltown

2010 Piltown beat Gaultier, Waterford (Under-16) 7-6 to 0-0 in Piltown

Ladies Gaelic Football

Ladies' Gaelic Football or Girls Gaelic Football is relatively new to Piltown. There had been success in 1999 in the county INTO mini 7s for Piltown NS but Girls Gaelic Football really got into full flow in Piltown National School in 2005 when former Waterford player Ms Bridget Drohan came to the school to teach, although the school had previous teams in the mini sevens and similar.  In 2007, the girls again won the mini Sevens in Kilkenny.

In 2008, a landmark was reached when the Primary Schools team won the Roinn B championship in Nowlan Park by beating Gowran by 5-6 to 2-2. In 2009, the School followed up with victory in the Roinn A final. It came after a replay with Thomastown in Nowlan Park when they comprehensively won by 10-1 to 1-2

Jennifer Norris and Sinead McCarthy became the first Piltown girls to play inter county for Kilkenny when they were part of the 2009 Leinster Under-14 Championship squad. Jennifer Norris went on the win a Leinster Blitz medal with Kilkenny when they beat Kildare in Carlow Town in the 2009 Division 3 final. It was the first time Kilkenny had won a Leinster ladies football blitz title.

In 2010, the interest in Ladies Gaelic Football skyrocketed. Owning and Templeourm National Schools combined to compete in the schools championships.  Furthermore, a club was set up in Piltown. The year was memorable in that Piltown National School won their third County Title in a row (2nd Roinn A) and Owning/Templeorum won the Roinn D title at the first attempt. Two primary schools county titles in the one year!

Sheila Norris started work on the new club. She was joined by Siobhan McCarthy and Fran McGrath and a trainer from Wicklow, John Kavanagh. On 15 April 2010, another historic first took place in Thomastown when Piltown fielded their first ladies Gaelic football team in a match. The minor team took on the might of the Kilkenny County Under-14 team who were in the Leinster semi final doing well despite defeat. 
Team: Niamh Dermody, Claire Power, Antonia Power (Capt), Stephanie Falconer, Debbie Phelan, Sarah Murphy, Jennifer Norris, Edel Long, Lorraine Long, Joanne Bourke, Lisa Walsh, Siobhan Dermody, Sinead McCarthy, Jean Power, Jessica Poyntz 
Subs: Sarah Walsh, Lisa McCarthy, Ciara O’Dwyer, Leanne O’Hara, Aisling Briscoe 
Mentors were John Kavanagh and Sheila Norris

The club's first win came in an International Under-16 Blitz on 10 July 2010 when they beat Roanmore 2-1 to 2-0 at W.I.T. in Carriganore.
Panel: Lorraine Long (Capt), Lisa Walsh, Katelynn Phelan, Stephanie Falconer, Sinead McCarthy, Debbie Phelan, Jennifer Norris, Laura Grace, Joanne Bourke, Caroline O’Shea. Claire Power, Shannon Keever, Sarah Walsh, Aisling Briscoe, Sarah McTiernan, Lisa Norris.
On 31 July 2010, the Under-16's beat Mullinavat in the Shield Final of the county 7-a-side blitz to record the club's first county title. This took place at the O'Loughlin Gaels grounds.
Team: Stephanie Falconer (Capt), Jennifer Norris, Antonia Power, Debbie Phelan, Laura Grace, Claire Power, Katelynn Phelan.
This was followed up by victory in the Under-14 county blitz held in Freshford a few weeks later to cap a magnificent first year of the club.
Under-14 Squad: Claire Power (Capt), Stephanie Falconer, Jean Power, Leanne O’Hara, Sarah Murphy, Alice Talbot, Siobhan Dermody, Katelynn Phelan, Lisa McCarthy
In 2011, Piltown entered an Under-16 and Minor team in the Tipperary league/Championship, reaching the semi finals of the Under-16 Roinn C  and Minor Roinn D championships. In 2012, the club fielded an Under-12 team. 
In 2013, Kilkenny underage leagues were formed and minors were permitted to play with Three Friars club in adult games who entered the Tipperary Junior championship.  Three Friars won the Junior "C" title beating Moyle Rovers in Munroe by 1-7 to 0-3, thus Jennifer Norris, Lorraine Long and Aine Knox won junior county medals.  Seamus Norris became the clubs first county mentor at Minor and Under-12 level with Kilkenny reaching the Leinster Semi Final in Minor. On 28 October 2013, the Club played its first Kilkenny championship county when the Under-14's were beaten by Erins 3-6 to 0-1 in the "B" Final at Nowlan Park. In 2014, Piltown were again beaten by Erins Own in the Roinn A Final, 5-3 to 6-12 in Callan.  However, on 22 November 2014, Piltown won their first ever Championship winning the Under-14 Roinn B championship beating Barrow Gaels in Graignamanagh by 7-3 to 1-8
Team: Danielle O'Brien, Megan Byrne, Jennifer O'Dea, Maria Phelan, Lisa Norris (Capt), Vivienne Healy, Sarah Tobin, Laura Power, Maire Beth Kirby, Aoibheann Kavanagh(1-1), Bribhanna Doody, Aoife Doyle(1-0), Sine Kavanagh, Marlise Flynn(2-1), Chloe Power (2-1,0-1f)
Subs: Anna O'Brien, Patsy Kenny, Ciara Dunne, Melissa Byrne (1-0), Aine Doyle, Emma Phelan
Team Management: Seamus Norris and Aine Knox.

In 2013, Piltown Club initiated Gaelic4Mothers and Others with club coaches Seamus Norris and Aine Knox thus introducing another group of people to GAA. They played their first match away to Thomastown on the 19 September 2013. The first ever adult ladies Gaelic football team from Piltown was; Michelle O’Shea (Capt), Annette O’Connell, Deirdre Kane, Catherine O’Neill, Mandy McGrath, Aine O’Keeffe, Lindsay Beukes, Ann Power, Catherine Moore, Kim Brophy, Aisling Cummins,  Mary Morgan. Grainne Gault, Miriam Twohig, Sinead Doyle
On 18 October 2014, Piltown G4M+O played in their first ever National Blitz in Portmarnock.  Although non competitive, Piltown did beat teams from traditional football countiesas they won all their games beating Ballymun Kickhams (Dublin), Athlone (Westmeath), Killea (Tipperary) and Lissan (Derry). The squad was Aine Knox, Catherine Moore, Catherine Crotty, Deirdre Kane, Elaine Kennington, Sarah Cuddihy, Michelle O'Shea, Ann Power, Ann Gahan, Deirdre Dowd.

Ladies Football Roll of Honour 

Kilkenny Primary Under-16 Championship

2016 "B" Piltown beat Dunnamaggin 7-7 to 3-5 in Windgap

Kilkenny Under-16 Shield

2010 Piltown beat Mullinavat 3-6 to 3-2 at St. Johns Park

Kilkenny Under-14 Championship

2014 "B" Piltown beat Barrow Gaels 7-3 to 1-8 in Graignamanagh

2020 "B" Piltown beat Kilkenny City 4-3 to 0-0 in Thomastown

Freshford Under-14 Blitz

2010 Piltown (St. Lachtain's Freshford, Mullinahone)

Kilkenny Under-13 Roinn B Championship

2015 Piltown beat Erins Own  2-7 to 0-2 in Clara

Kilkenny Primary Schools Under-13 Championship

2008 "B" Piltown beat Gowran 5-6 to 2-2 in Nowlan Park

2009 "A" Piltown beat Thomastown 10-1 to 1-2 (Replay) in Nowlan Park

2010 "A" Piltown beat St. Johns 6-2 to 1-3 in Nowlan Park

2010 "D" Owning/Templeorum beat 2-13 to 2-0 Galmoy in Nowlan Park

2011 "C" Owning/Templeorum beat Carrickshock 2-5 to 2-4 in Piltown

2012 "B" Owning/Templeorum beat Kilmanagh 3-6 to 1-0 in Kilkenny

Kilkenny Primary Schools INTO Mini Sevens

1992 Piltown

1997 Piltown

1999 Piltown

2002 Owning/Templeorum

2003 Owning/Templeorum

2007 Piltown

Kilkenny Under-12 Championship

2015 "C" Piltown beat Muckalee 6-6 to 3-4 in Clara

2016 "D" Piltown beat Dunnamaggin 2-4 to 1-1 in Thomastown

2017 "B" Piltown beat Clara 13-4 to 0-0 in Piltown

2018 "C" Piltown beat Clara 4-5 to 0-2 in Dunmore

Thomastown Under-12 Blitz

2012 Piltown (Barrow Gaels,  [2], Thomastown [2])

References

External links
 Piltown GAA website

Gaelic games clubs in County Kilkenny
Hurling clubs in County Kilkenny
Gaelic football clubs in County Kilkenny